Petra Kvitová was the defending champion, but chose not to participate this year.

Jil Teichmann won her first career WTA title, defeating Karolína Muchová in the final 7–6(7–5), 3–6, 6–4.

Seeds

Draw

Finals

Top half

Bottom half

Qualifying

Seeds

Qualifiers

Lucky losers

Draw

First qualifier

Second qualifier

Third qualifier

Fourth qualifier

References

External links
 Main draw
 Qualifying draw

Singles